James, Jim, or Jimmy Duncan may refer to:

Politicians
James Duncan (Pennsylvania politician) (1756–1844), American politician from Pennsylvania
James Duncan (MP for Barrow-in-Furness) (1858–1911), British lawyer and Liberal politician
James H. Duncan (1793–1869), American politician from Massachusetts
James Hastings Duncan (1855–1928), British Liberal Member of Parliament for Otley, 1900–1918
Jim Duncan (Alaska politician) (born 1942), former Speaker of the Alaska House of Representatives, congressional candidate
Jimmy Duncan (politician) (born 1947), American politician from Tennessee
Sir James Duncan, 1st Baronet (1899–1974), British politician

Sportspeople
James Duncan (discus thrower) (1887–1955), American athlete
James Duncan (left back) (fl. 1878–1882), Scottish footballer (Alexandra Athletic, Rangers and Scotland)
James Duncan (outside left) (fl. 1890–1893), Scottish footballer (Sheffield United)
James Duncan (basketball) (born 1977), basketball coach 
Jamie Duncan (born 1975), American football linebacker
Jim Duncan (baseball) (1871–1901), American catcher and first baseman in Major League Baseball
Jim Duncan (cornerback) (1946–1972), American football player 
Jim Duncan (defensive end) (1924–2011), American football player and coach
Jim Duncan (footballer) (born 1938), English professional footballer
Jimmy Duncan (footballer, born 1930) (1930–2014), Scottish footballer
Jimmy Duncan (rugby union) (1869–1953), New Zealand rugby union footballer, coach and referee

Others
James Duncan (art collector) (1834–1905), Scottish sugar refiner and philanthropist
James Duncan (bishop) (1913–2000), Episcopal bishop in America
James Duncan (missionary) (1813–1907), New Zealand missionary and Presbyterian minister
James Duncan (musician) (born 1968), Canadian-born musician, improviser and house music producer
James Duncan (surgeon) (1810–1866), Scottish surgeon and main manufacturer of chloroform in 19th century Britain
James Duncan (union leader) (1857–1928), Scottish-American union leader
James Duncan (United States Army officer) (1811–1849), American artillery officer of the Mexican–American War
James Duncan (zoologist) (1804–1861), Scottish naturalist
Jimmy Duncan (songwriter) (1927–2011), American songwriter
James K. L. Duncan (1845–1913), American soldier and Medal of Honor recipient
James Matthews Duncan (1826–1890), Scottish physician

See also
Duncan James (born 1978), British singer with the band Blue
Duncan James (disambiguation)